Eugène-Jean-Claude-Joseph Desflèches, M.E.P.  (1814–1887) (Chinese: 范若瑟) was a Roman Catholic prelate who served as Titular Archbishop of Claudiopolis in Honoriade (1883–1887), Vicar Apostolic of Eastern Szechwan (1856–1883), and Titular Bishop of Sinitis (1840–1883).

Biography
Eugène-Jean-Claude-Joseph Desflèches was born in Jonage, France on 13 Feb 1814 and ordained a priest in the La Société des Missions Etrangères on 23 Dec 1837.
On 18 Dec 1840, he was appointed during the papacy of Pope Gregory XVI as Titular Bishop of Sinitis.
On 28 Apr 1844, he was consecrated bishop by Jacques-Léonard Pérocheau, Titular Bishop of Maxula Prates. 
On 2 Apr 1856, he was appointed during the papacy of Pope Pius IX as Vicar Apostolic of Eastern Szechwan.
He served as Vicar Apostolic of Eastern Szechwan until his resignation on 11 Feb 1883. 
On 20 Feb 1883, he was appointed during the papacy of Pope Leo XIII as Titular Archbishop of Claudiopolis in Honoriade.
He died on 8 Nov 1887.

Episcopal succession

See also 
 Catholic Church in Sichuan
 Christianity in Sichuan

References 

19th-century Roman Catholic bishops in China
Bishops appointed by Pope Gregory XVI
Bishops appointed by Pope Pius IX
Bishops appointed by Pope Leo XIII
1814 births
1887 deaths
Roman Catholic missionaries in Sichuan
Paris Foreign Missions Society bishops
French Roman Catholic titular bishops